The Sarandí del Yí Shear Zone is a strike slip shear zone in Uruguay. The shear zone has a NNW-SSE orientation and a dextral relative direction. It runs across the Río de la Plata Craton from  the coast east of Montevideo in the south to the town of Sarandí del Yí.

References 

Geology of Uruguay
Strike-slip faults
Precambrian South America
Shear zones